Anna Dogonadze (born February 15, 1973) is a German trampoline gymnast of Georgian origin who won a gold medal in the event of trampolining at the 2004 Summer Olympics.

She was born on 15 February 1973 in Mtskheta, Georgian SSR, (present day Georgia). Prior to Georgian independence, she competed for the Soviet Union, and afterwards represented Georgia in international competition. Dogonadze became a German citizen after marrying a German national. They live in Bad Kreuznach, Germany, with their daughter Mariam. By profession, Dogonadze is a teacher.

Dogonadze's career highlight was her Olympic win in 2004, which followed a disastrous final in the Sydney Olympics four years earlier. She was the oldest finalist in her event at the 2004 Athens games, at age 31; the oldest competing in her event at the 2008 Beijing Games, at 35 years old; and oldest in her event at the 2012 London games, at 39 years old.

Career achievements

 Winner in synchronized trampolining, World Games 2005, with Jessica Simon
 Olympic gold medal, 2004
 World Champion 1998, 2001
 European Masters 1997, 1998, 2000
 German Masters 2000, 2001
 German Synchronised Masters 2001

External links
 
 
 
 
 
 

1973 births
Living people
German female trampolinists
Olympic gymnasts of Germany
Olympic gold medalists for Germany
Olympic medalists in gymnastics
Medalists at the 2004 Summer Olympics
Gymnasts at the 2004 Summer Olympics
Gymnasts at the 2008 Summer Olympics
Gymnasts at the 2012 Summer Olympics
World Games gold medalists
World Games bronze medalists
Competitors at the 1997 World Games
Competitors at the 2001 World Games
Medalists at the Trampoline Gymnastics World Championships
German people of Georgian descent
People from Mtskheta
Female trampolinists from Georgia (country)
21st-century German women